Arsenović is a Serbian surname, a patronymic derived from the given name Arsen (itself a diminutive of Greek Arsenios). It may refer to:

Dragan Arsenović (1952–2004), Yugoslav Serbian footballer
Konstantin Arsenović (1940–2017), Serb politician and military official in Serbia serving in the National Assembly of Serbia from 2008 until his death in 2017
Nikola Arsenović (1823–1887), Serb tailor and designer, called a Yugoslav ethnographer

See also
Arsenijević
Arsen
Arsène
Arsić

Serbian surnames
Patronymic surnames
Surnames from given names